The Rwandan men's cricket team toured Tanzania in October and November 2022 to play a five-match Twenty20 International (T20I) series and a 50-over match against the hosts Tanzania. The series was part of the teams' preparation before both teams participate in the 2022–23 ICC Men's T20 World Cup Africa Qualifier in Rwanda later in November.

Squads

T20I series

1st T20I

2nd T20I

3rd T20I

4th T20I

5th T20I

50-over match

Notes

References

External links
 Series home at ESPNcricinfo

International cricket competitions in 2022–23
2022 in Tanzanian sport
2022 in Rwandan sport